John Stevenson McDonald (October 31, 1828 – February 15, 1917) was a Scottish-born Ontario farmer and political figure. He represented Bruce Centre in the Legislative Assembly of Ontario as a Liberal-Patrons of Industry member from 1894 to 1898.

He was born in Ayrshire, Scotland and educated at Sorn. He served on the council for Huron Township, Ontario, serving as reeve from 1888 to 1891, and was also warden for Bruce County. He also served as treasurer for the township.

External links 
The Canadian parliamentary companion, 1891 JA Gemmill

1828 births
19th-century Canadian businesspeople
Ontario Patrons of Industry MPPs
People from East Ayrshire
People from Bruce County
Scottish emigrants to Canada
1917 deaths
19th-century Canadian politicians